Scott Jackson Crichton (born October 30, 1991) is a former American football defensive end. He played college football at Oregon State and was drafted by the Minnesota Vikings in the third round, 72nd overall of the 2014 NFL Draft.

High school
Crichton was born in Tacoma, Washington to immigrant parents from Samoa. Crichton attended Henry Foss High School, where he was a three-year letterman at defensive end and linebacker, but also played some tight end. He was named the Narrows League Defensive MVP after collecting 78 solo tackles as a senior. He was also named to the Washington 4A First Team All-State, and was the Tacoma Weekly Player of the Year.

Crichton also competed in track & field at Henry Foss. As a senior in 2009, he posted personal-best throws of 13.39 meters (43 feet, 10 inches) in the shot put and 37.61 meters (123 feet, 4 inches) in the discus. In addition, he was also timed at 4.6 seconds in the 40-yard dash.

Considered a three-star recruit by Rivals.com, Crichton was rated as the 44th best defensive end prospect in the nation and the 12th best player in the state of Washington. He committed to Oregon State on January 16, 2010. He also had a scholarship offer from Washington State.

College career
As a freshman in 2010, Crichton redshirted but earned defensive scout team Co-MVP. In 2011, he had a sensational season as a redshirt-freshman after finishing the season with 74 tackles including 14.5 tackles for loss, tops in the nation among freshmen, a team-leading six sacks and six forced fumbles. He was named to the College Football News Freshman All-American team. He continued where he left off, recording 44 total and setting career highs in tackles for loss (17.5) and sacks (9), on his way to being named a first team All-Pac-12 selection. In 2013, he finished his season with 47 tackles, including 19 for a loss, 7.5 sacks and three forced fumbles, earning second team all conference honors.

On January 4, 2014, he announced he would forgo his senior season and enter the 2014 NFL Draft.

Statistics

Professional career
Rated as one of the best prospects at his position (defensive end), Crichton was projected as a second-round draft choice by CBSSports.com.

Minnesota Vikings
Crichton was drafted by the Minnesota Vikings with the 8th pick in the 3rd round (72nd overall) of the 2014 NFL Draft. In the 2014 season, Crichton played in 8 games with 0 starts. On December 10, 2015, Crichton suffered a concussion in the Minnesota Vikings' loss to the Arizona Cardinals. Then on December 19, 2015, Crichton was placed on Injured Reserve. Before his 2015 season prematurely ended, Crichton played in 13 games with 0 starts.

On August 31, 2016, Crichton was placed on injured reserve after clearing waivers.

On March 24, 2017, Crichton was released by the Vikings.

Buffalo Bills
On March 27, 2017, Crichton was claimed off waivers by the Buffalo Bills. Two days later, he was waived by the Bills after failing a physical.

References

External links
 Minnesota Vikings bio
 Oregon State Beavers bio

1991 births
Living people
American football defensive ends
American sportspeople of Samoan descent
Buffalo Bills players
Minnesota Vikings players
Oregon State Beavers football players
Players of American football from Tacoma, Washington